David Ethan Kennerly directed five massively multiplayer games in the US and Korea. He localized Korea's first world, Nexus: The Kingdom of the Winds, and designed the social system of Dark Ages. Before joining Nexon in 1997, he designed The X-Files Trivia Game for 20th Century Fox, and troubleshot US Army networks in Korea.

David encourages creativity among developers and players. He helped organize MUD-Dev Conferences, and founded an online library of fan fiction. David has authored on game design for Charles River Media, ITT Tech, Westwood College, Gamasutra.com, GameDev.net, and IGDA.

After a stint designing board games at TableStar Games, David is now doing video game design in Utah.

External links
http://www.finegamedesign.com - Web site of David Kennerly with articles, resources, and information.
http://www.gamedev.net/reference/articles/article2206.asp - "Randomness without Replacement." Article on RPG game mechanics.
http://www.gamasutra.com/features/20030815/kennerly_01.shtml - "Better Game Design through Data Mining." Article introducing data analysis for improving design in online games.
http://www.nexustk.com - Nexus: The Kingdom of the Winds
http://www.darkages.com - Dark Ages

Living people
Year of birth missing (living people)